is a Japanese animation studio founded in 1972 by ex–Mushi Pro staff, including Masao Maruyama, Osamu Dezaki, and Yoshiaki Kawajiri.

Madhouse has created and helped to produce many well-known shows, OVAs and films, starting with TV anime series Ace o Nerae! (produced by Tokyo Movie Shinsha) in 1973, and including Wicked City, Ninja Scroll, Perfect Blue,  Vampire Hunter D: Bloodlust, Trigun, Di Gi Charat, Black Lagoon, Death Note, Paprika, Wolf Children, Parasyte: The Maxim and the first season of One-Punch Man. Unlike other studios founded at this time such as AIC and J.C.Staff, their strength was and is primarily in TV shows and theatrical features. Expanding from the initial Mushi Pro staff, Madhouse recruited important directors such as Morio Asaka, Masayuki Kojima, and Satoshi Kon during the 1990s. Their staff roster expanded in the 2000s to include Mamoru Hosoda, Takeshi Koike, and Mitsuo Iso, as well as many younger television directors. The studio was also responsible for the first Beyblade anime series as well as the Dragon Drive anime and the 2011 anime adaptation of Hunter × Hunter.

The studio often collaborates with known manga artists, including Naoki Urasawa and Clamp. Madhouse produced adaptations of Urasawa's Yawara!, Master Keaton and Monster, with Masayuki Kojima helming the latter two. The company has animated a number of CLAMP's titles, including Tokyo Babylon, two versions of X (a theatrical movie and a TV series), Cardcaptor Sakura and its sequel Clear Card, and Chobits.

History
Madhouse was established in 1972 by ex–Mushi Production animators, including Masao Maruyama, Osamu Dezaki, and Yoshiaki Kawajiri, with funding from Yutaka Fujioka, the founder of Tokyo Movie, and co-produced its earliest series with Tokyo Movie. In February 2004, Madhouse became a subsidiary of Index Corporation. On February 8, 2011, Nippon TV became Madhouse's primary stockholder (replacing Index Corporation), via a third-party allocation of new shares. NTV bought 128,667 new shares (each ¥7,772) issued by Madhouse for ¥999,999,924 total (about $12.4 million), raising its stake in the company from 10.4% to 84.5%. Index Corporation's stake in Madhouse fell from 60.91% to 10.54%. In January 2012, Madhouse announced their acquisition of the animation rights to the Peanuts comic strip. In March 2014, NTV bought all the shares belonging to Index Corporation, increasing its stake in Madhouse to 95%.

Business
The studio employs approximately 70 employees, with employment levels varying depending on the number of productions currently underway. Additionally, the company has invested in the animation studio DR Movie. Madhouse has a subsidiary, Madbox Co., Ltd., that mainly focuses on computer graphics.

Works

Television

1973–2000
 Aim for the Ace! (1973–1974, co-animated with Tokyo Movie)
 Gamba no Bōken (1975, co-animated with Tokyo Movie)
 Jetter Mars (1977, co-animated with Toei Animation)
 Nobody's Boy: Remi (1977–1978, co-animated with Tokyo Movie)
 Treasure Island (1978–1979, co-animated with Tokyo Movie)
 Galactic Patrol Lensman (1984–1985, co-animated with Tatsunoko Productions)
 Yawara! (1989–1992)
 DNA² (1994, co-animated with Studio Deen)
 Azuki-chan (1995–1998)
 Trigun (1998)
 Cardcaptor Sakura (1998–2000)
 Master Keaton (1998–2000)
 Bomberman B-Daman Bakugaiden (1998–1999)
 Super Doll Licca-chan (1998–1999)
 Pet Shop of Horrors (1999)
 Jubei-chan: The Secret of the Lovely Eyepatch (1999)
 Di Gi Charat (1999–2001)
 Reign: The Conqueror (1999)
 Magic User's Club (1999)
 Bomberman B-Daman Bakugaiden V (1999–2000)

2000s
 Boogiepop Phantom (2000)
 Carried by the Wind: Tsukikage Ran (2000)
 Hidamari no Ki (2000)
 Sakura Wars (2000)
 Hajime no Ippo: The Fighting! (2000–2002)
 Beyblade (2001)
 Galaxy Angel (2001–2004)
 Shingu: Secret of the Stellar Wars (2001)
 Chance Pop Session (2001)
 Magical Meow Meow Taruto (2001)
 X (2001–2002)
 Kirby: Right Back at Ya! (2001)
 Aquarian Age: Sign for Evolution (2002)
 Chobits (2002)
 Magical Shopping Arcade Abenobashi (2002)
 Pita-Ten (2002)
 Dragon Drive (2002–2003)
 Hanada Shōnen Shi (2002–2003)
 Panyo Panyo Di Gi Charat (2002)
 Rizelmine (2002, co-animated with IMAGIN)
 Mirage of Blaze (2002)
 Ninja Scroll: The Series (2003)
 Texhnolyze (2003)
 Gungrave (2003–2004)
 Gunslinger Girl (2003–2004)
 Uninhabited Planet Survive! (2003–2004, co-animated with Telecom Animation Film)
 Di Gi Charat Nyo! (2003–2004)
 Gokusen (2004)
 Jubei-chan: The Counter Attack of Siberia Yagyu (2004)
 Paranoia Agent (2004)
 Tenjho Tenge (2004)
 Monster (2004–2005)
 BECK: Mongolian Chop Squad (2004–2005)
 Sweet Valerian (2004)
 Strawberry 100% (2005)
 Akagi (2005–2006)
 Paradise Kiss (2005)
 Oku-sama wa Joshi Kōsei (2005)
 Kiba (2006–2007)
 Strawberry Panic! (2006)
 NANA (2006–2007)
 The Story of Saiunkoku (2006–2008)
 Black Lagoon (2006)
 Yume Tsukai (2006)
 Otogi-Jūshi Akazukin (2006–2007)
 Kemonozume (2006)
 Death Note (2006–2007)
 Tokyo Tribe 2 (2006–2007)
 Claymore (2007)
 Oh! Edo Rocket (2007)
 Princess Resurrection (2007)
 Dennō Coil (2007)
 Devil May Cry (2007)
 Shigurui (2007)
 Gyakkyō Burai Kaiji (2007–2008)
 Neuro: Supernatural Detective (2007–2008)
 Mokke (2007–2008)
 MapleStory (2007–2008)
 Ani*Kuri15  (2007–2008)
 Chi's Sweet Home (2008–2009)
 Allison & Lillia (2008)
 Kamen no Maid Guy (2008)
 Top Secret ~The Revelation~ (2008)
 Kaiba (2008)
 Batman: Gotham Knight (2008)
 Ultraviolet: Code 044 (2008)
 Casshern Sins (2008–2009)
 Kurozuka (2008)
 Mōryō no Hako (2008)
 One Outs (2008–2009)
 Stitch! (2008–2010)
 Chaos;Head (2008)
 Hajime no Ippo: New Challenger (2009)
 Rideback (2009)
 Sōten Kōro (2009)
 Needless (2009)
 Kobato (2009–2010)
 Aoi Bungaku (2009)

2010s
 Rainbow: Nisha Rokubō no Shichinin (2010)
 The Tatami Galaxy (2010)
 Highschool of the Dead (2010)
 Marvel Anime (2010–2011)
 Gyakkyō Burai Kaiji: Hakairoku-hen (2011)
 Hunter × Hunter (2011–2014)
 Chihayafuru (2011–2020)
 The Ambition of Oda Nobuna (2012, co-animated with Studio Gokumi)
 Btooom! (2012)
 Photo Kano (2013)
 Sunday Without God (2013)
 Hajime no Ippo: Rising (2013–2014, co-animated with MAPPA)
 Ace of Diamond (2013–2016, co-animated with Production I.G)
 Magical Warfare (2014)
 The Irregular at Magic High School (2014)
 No Game No Life (2014)
 Hanayamata (2014)
 Parasyte -the maxim- (2014–2015)
 Death Parade (2015)
 My Love Story!! (2015)
 Overlord (2015–present)
 One-Punch Man (2015)
 Prince of Stride: Alternative (2016)
 Alderamin on the Sky (2016)
 All Out!! (2016–2017, co-animated with TMS Entertainment)
 ACCA: 13-Territory Inspection Dept. (2017)
 Marvel Future Avengers (2017)
 A Place Further than the Universe (2018)
 Cardcaptor Sakura: Clear Card (2018)
 Okko's Inn (2018)
 Mr. Tonegawa: Middle Management Blues (2018)
 Boogiepop and Others (2019)
 Ace of Diamond Act II (2019–2020)
 Afterlost (2019)
 No Guns Life (2019–2020)

2020s
 Sonny Boy (2021)
 The Vampire Dies in No Time (2021–present)
 Takt Op. Destiny (2021, co-animated with MAPPA)
 Police in a Pod (2022)
 Bibliophile Princess (2022)
 My Love Story With Yamada-kun at Lv999 (2023)
 AI no Idenshi (2023)
 Frieren (2023)
 Chi: On the Movements of the Earth (TBA)

Specials
 Natsufuku no Shōjo-tachi (August 7, 1988)
 Hiroshima ni Ichiban Densha ga Hashitta (August 6, 1993)
 Yawara! Special - Zutto Kimi no Koto ga (July 19, 1996)
 Di Gi Charat - Summer Special 2000 (August 22, 2000 – August 23, 2000)
 Di Gi Charat - Christmas Special (December 16, 2000)
 Di Gi Charat - Ohanami Special (April 6, 2001)
 Di Gi Charat - Natsuyasumi Special (August 2, 2001 – August 3, 2001)
Di Gi Charat - Tsuyu Special (August 25, 2001)
 Hajime no Ippo - Champion Road (June 25, 2003)
 A Spirit of the Sun (September 17 – 18, 2006)
 Ani*Kuri 15 (May 7 – December 10, 2007, animated the two of the fifteen segments, "Sancha (The Aromatic Tea) Blues" and "Good Morning", respectively)
 Death Note: Relight - Visions of a God (August 31, 2007)
 Death Note: Relight 2 - L's Successors (August 22, 2008)
 Megumi to Taiyō: Kajū Gummi Tweet Love Story (May 11, 2011)
 Megumi to Taiyō II: Kajū Gummi Tweet Mystery (February 24, 2012, co-animated with MAPPA)
 Megumi to Taiyō III: Kajū Gummi Tweet Fantasy (June 12, 2012, co-animated with MAPPA)

Film
Madhouse's early theatrical work included assistance on the Barefoot Gen films, and Lensman, an anime movie based on the space opera series by pulp science fiction author E.E. "Doc" Smith.

In the late 1980s and early 1990s, director Yoshiaki Kawajiri produced a string of action films including  Wicked City, Demon City Shinjuku, and Ninja Scroll.

In the late 1990s, the studio aimed at a younger female audience with Morio Asaka's two Cardcaptor Sakura films, based on the popular television series.

In the early 2000s, an ambitious collaboration with Tezuka Productions resulted in Metropolis, directed by Rintaro and adapted from the manga by Osamu Tezuka. Earlier collaborations with Tezuka productions included two feature-length films made for Sanrio starring Tezuka's unicorn character Unico.

Director Satoshi Kon produced all four of his films with the studio: Perfect Blue, Millennium Actress, Tokyo Godfathers, and Paprika, as well as his TV series Paranoia Agent. Kon was also making his fifth film the Dreaming Machine with Madhouse, although it was left incomplete at his death in 2010.

In 2003, Madhouse produced Nasu: Summer in Andalusia, which was adapted from the seinen manga Nasu by Iou Kuroda and directed by Studio Ghibli veteran Kitarō Kōsaka. Nasu was the first Japanese animated film ever selected for screening at the renowned Cannes Film Festival. Kōsaka followed up his film with an OVA sequel in 2007.

In 2006, director Mamoru Hosoda began his career with the studio by directing The Girl Who Leapt Through Time.

Recent productions included Masayuki Kojima's theatrical debut Forest of Piano (2007), Hosoda's acclaimed Summer Wars (2009), Sunao Katabuchi's Mai Mai Miracle (2009), the company's first CG animated film, Yona Yona Penguin (2009), Takeshi Koike's feature film debut Redline (2009), a theatrical version of the Trigun series, Trigun: Badlands Rumble (2010), and The Tibetan Dog, a co-production with China (2011).

The first film in the Hunter × Hunter franchise, Hunter × Hunter: Phantom Rouge premiered on January 12, 2013.

Madhouse co-produced Wolf Children (2012) with Mamoru Hosoda's Studio Chizu.

Collectively, Madhouse films have won a total of two Japan Academy Prizes, four Grand Prizes in the Animation Division at Japan Media Arts Festival, two Gertie Awards, six Mainichi Film Awards (three Ōfuji Noburō Awards, and three Animation Grand Awards), two Tokyo Anime Awards for Animation of the Year, and five Animation Kobe Feature Film Awards.

1980s
 The Fantastic Adventures of Unico (March 14, 1981)
 Natsu e no Tobira (March 20, 1981) (co-produced by Toei Animation)
 Haguregumo (April 24, 1982) (co-produced by Toei Animation)
 Harmagedon (March 12, 1983)
 Unico in the Island of Magic (July 16, 1983)
 Barefoot Gen (July 21, 1983)
 Lensman: Secret of the Lens (July 7, 1984) 
 The Dagger of Kamui (March 9, 1985)
 Barefoot Gen 2 (June 14, 1986)
 Phoenix: Karma Chapter (December 20, 1986)
 Toki no Tabibito: Time Stranger (December 20, 1986)
 Wicked City (April 25, 1987)
 Neo Tokyo (September 25, 1987)
 Twilight of the Cockroaches (November 21, 1987)
 Legend of the Galactic Heroes: My Conquest is the Sea of Stars (February 6, 1988) (co-produced by Artland)

1990s
 A Wind Named Amnesia (December 22, 1990)
 Urusei Yatsura: Always, My Darling (August 18, 1991)
 Yawara! Soreyuke Koshinuke Kids!! (August 1, 1992)
 Ninja Scroll (June 5, 1993)
 Kattobase! Dreamers ―Carp Tanjō Monogatari― (January 22, 1994)
 Anne no Nikki (August 19, 1995)
 Memories  (December 23, 1995)
 X (August 3, 1996)
 Perfect Blue (August 5, 1997)
 Clover (August 21, 1999)
 Cardcaptor Sakura: The Movie (August 21, 1999)

2000s
 Cardcaptor Sakura Movie 2: The Sealed Card (2000)
 Vampire Hunter D: Bloodlust (2001)
 Metropolis (2001)
 Millennium Actress (2001)
 Di Gi Charat - A Trip to the Planet (2001)
 WXIII: Patlabor the Movie 3 (2002)
 Hajime no Ippo: Champion Road (2003)
 Nasu: Summer in Andalusia (2003)
 Tokyo Godfathers (2003)
 The Girl Who Leapt Through Time (2006)
 Paprika (2006)
 Cinnamon the Movie (2007)
 Highlander: The Search for Vengeance (2007)
 Forest of Piano (2007)
 Hells (2008)
 Batman: Gotham Knight (2008, co-animated with Studio 4°C, Bee Train Production, Production I.G)
 Summer Wars (2009)
 Mai Mai Miracle (2009)
 Redline (2009)
 Yona Yona Penguin (2009)

2010s
 Trigun: Badlands Rumble (2010)
 The Tibetan Dog (2011)
 The Princess and the Pilot (2011, co-animated with TMS Entertainment)
 Hunter × Hunter: Phantom Rouge (2013)
 Death Billiards (2013)
 Hunter × Hunter: The Last Mission (2013)
 No Game, No Life Zero (2017)
 Kimi no Koe wo Todoketai (2017)
 Okko's Inn Movie (2018, co-produced with DLE)

2020s
 Goodbye, Don Glees! (2022)
 Kingdom of Gold, Kingdom of Water (2023)

OVAs
(These also include some outsourced productions)

1980s
 Wounded Man (1986–1988)
 Phoenix: Yamato Chapter (1987)
 Phoenix: Space Chapter (1987)
 Bride of Deimos (1988)
 Demon City Shinjuku (1988)
 Fairy King (1988)
 Goku Midnight Eye (1989)

1990s
 Nineteen 19 (1990)
 Cyber City Oedo 808 (1990–1991)
 Record of Lodoss War (1990–1991)
 Devil Hunter Yohko (1990–1995)
 Doomed Megalopolis (1991–1992)
 Urusei Yatsura (OVA's 10 and 11) (1991)
 Tokyo Babylon (1992–1994)
 Zetsuai 1989 (1992–1994)
 Download: Devil's Circuit (1992)
 Battle Angel (1993)
 Mermaid's Scar (1993)
 The Cockpit (Slipstream segment, 1993)
 Final Fantasy: Legend of the Crystals (1994)
 Phantom Quest Corp. (1994–1995)
 Clamp in Wonderland (1994–2007)
 Spirit Warrior (1994)
 DNA² (co-produced with Studio Deen, 1995)
 Bio Hunter (1995)
 Birdy the Mighty (1996–1997)
 Night Warriors: Darkstalkers' Revenge (1997–1998)
 Twilight of the Dark Master (1997)

2000s
 Space Pirate Captain Herlock: The Endless Odyssey (2002–2003)
 Trava: Fist Planet (2003)
 The Animatrix ("Program" and "World Record" sequences) (2003)
 Hajime no Ippo: Mashiba vs. Kimura (2003)
 Lament of the Lamb (2003–2004)
 Aquarian Age: The Movie (2003)
  Di Gi Charat Theater - Leave it to Pyoko! (2003)
 Tsuki no Waltz (2004)
 Otogi-Jūshi Akazukin (2005)
 Last Order: Final Fantasy VII (2005)
 Strawberry 100% (2005)
 Nasu: A Migratory Bird with Suitcase (2007)
 Batman: Gotham Knight (animated sequences, 2008) 
 Hellsing Ultimate (V–VII) (2008–2009)

2010s
 Black Lagoon: Roberta's Blood Trail (2010–2011)
 Supernatural: The Anime Series (2011)
 Drifters of the Dead (2011)
 Arata-naru Sekai (2012)
 Iron Man: Rise of Technovore (2013)
 Avengers Confidential: Black Widow and Punisher (2014)

2020s
 ACCA: 13-Territory Inspection Dept. - Regards (2020)

Video games
 Sol-Feace (1991)
 Earnest Evans (1991)
 Annet Futatabi (1993)
 Wild Arms (1996)
 Solatorobo: Red the Hunter (2010)
 Persona 2: Eternal Punishment (intro sequence) (2012)
 Persona 4 Golden (intro sequence) (2012)
 Persona 4 Arena (intro sequence) (2012)
 Etrian Odyssey Untold: The Millennium Girl (2013)
 Etrian Odyssey 2 Untold: The Fafnir Knight (2014)
 Echoes of Mana (trailer) (2022)

Collaborations
Madhouse designed the characters for Hudson Soft's game Virus (the first installment of the Virus Buster Serge franchise). Madhouse worked with Square Enix on the OVA Last Order: Final Fantasy VII as well as Capcom for the mini series of Devil May Cry: The Animated Series.

They collaborated with Studio Ghibli by contributing animation to Hayao Miyazaki's My Neighbor Totoro (1988), Spirited Away (2001), and Howl's Moving Castle (2004), as well as Tomomi Mochizuki's I Can Hear the Sea (1993) and Goro Miyazaki's Tales from Earthsea (2006).

Madhouse collaborated with professional rapper Snoop Dogg in the 2006 horror-comedy movie Hood of Horror, in which they assisted in the animated sections of the movie.

They were commissioned by Top Cow Productions, an imprint of Image Comics, to provide a anime of Aphrodite IX. However left canceling for any explanation.

Madhouse also collaborated with Disney for the anime Stitch! for its first and second arcs (equal to 56 episodes total), between 2008 and 2010. They also animated the intro cutscene to PlayStation video game Wild Arms and the opening movie to PlayStation Vita video game Persona 4 Golden (Persona 4: The Golden in Japan), along with opening to the PSP remake of Persona 2: Eternal Punishment.

They worked with Marvel Entertainment to create adaptations of Blade, Iron Man, Wolverine and X-Men.

2010 also saw the publication of Devil, a manga intended specifically for the American market; the property is a collaboration with Dark Horse Comics, and is written and drawn by Torajiro Kishi.

Madhouse also participated in animating the Wakfu TV special Ogrest, la légende in collaboration with Ankama Japan.

Non-Japanese productions/Commission work/Foreign production history
 The Pirates of Dark Water (ダークウォーターの海賊) (February 25, 1991 – May 23, 1993) (Hanna-Barbera with Fil-Cartoons, Wang Film Productions, Tama Production, Big Star, Kennedy Cartoons and Mr. Big Cartoons)
 The Adventures of T-Rex (T-レックス) (1992–1993) (C&D (Créativité et Développement), Gunther-Wahl Productions, with Kitty Films)
 Street Fighter (ストリートファイター) (October 1995–May 1997) (co-production with InVision Entertainment, Graz Entertainment, USA Studios and Sunrise)
 Wing Commander Academy (ウイング・コマンダー・アカデミー) (September 21–December 21, 1996) (Universal Animation Studios)
 Todd McFarlane's Spawn (トッド・マクファーレンのスポーン) (May 16, 1997 – May 28, 1999) (HBO Animation, Todd McFarlane Entertainment, with Mook Animation, DR Movie, and Koko Enterprises Ltd.)
 X-Men: Evolution (X-メン:進化論) (November 4, 2000 – October 25, 2003) (Film Roman, Marvel Studios, with Mook Animation, DR Movie, and WHITE LINE)
 Hellboy: Sword of Storms (ヘル少年:嵐の剣) (October 28, 2006) (Film Roman, Revolution Studios, Starz Distribution)
 Hellboy: Blood and Iron (ヘル少年:血と鉄) (March 10, 2007) (Film Roman, Revolution Studios, Starz Distribution)
 Hulk Vs. Wolverine (ハルク対ウルヴァリン) (January 27, 2009) (Marvel Animation with MOI Animation)
 Hulk Vs. Thor (ハルク対トール) (January 27, 2009) (Marvel Animation with MOI Animation)
 Planet Hulk (プラネットハルク) (February 2, 2010) (Marvel Animation with MOI Animation)

See also
 MAPPA, an animation studio founded by former Madhouse producer Masao Maruyama.
 Triangle Staff, an animation studio founded by former Madhouse animators.

Notes

References

External links

  
 

 
Japanese animation studios
Animation studios in Tokyo
Mass media companies established in 1972
Japanese companies established in 1972
Nakano, Tokyo